Aleksandr Dmitriyevich Melekhov (born 18 January 2002) is a Russian football player. He plays for FC Chertanovo Moscow.

Club career
He made his debut in the Russian Football National League for FC Chertanovo Moscow on 22 August 2020 in a game against FC Neftekhimik Nizhnekamsk.

References

External links
 
 Profile by Russian Football National League

2002 births
Living people
Russian footballers
Association football midfielders
FC Chertanovo Moscow players
Russian First League players